Simon Brügger (born 17 September 1975) is a Swiss sailor. He competed at the 2000 Summer Olympics and the 2004 Summer Olympics.

References

External links
 

1975 births
Living people
Swiss male sailors (sport)
Olympic sailors of Switzerland
Sailors at the 2000 Summer Olympics – 470
Sailors at the 2004 Summer Olympics – 470
Place of birth missing (living people)